Millicent Dillon (née Gerson; born May 24, 1925) is an American writer. She was born in New York City and studied physics at Hunter College. She also worked variously at Princeton University, Standard Oil Company, Nuclear Energy for the Propulsion of Aircraft, and Northrop Aircraft. In 1965, at the age of 40, Dillon enrolled in the creative writing program at San Francisco State University. Subsequently, she taught at Foothill College in Los Altos, California. She also worked at Stanford University for nearly a decade.

Millicent became a full-time writer in 1983. She is best known for her scholarly works on the American writers Jane Bowles and Paul Bowles. These include a couple of biographies and a collection of letters, as well as The Viking Portable Paul and Jane Bowles (1994) which Dillon edited. Besides these, she also wrote short stories, novels, and plays. Her novel Harry Gold (2000) was nominated for the PEN Faulkner Award. She won five O. Henry awards and also received a Guggenheim Fellowship.

Dillon is the mother of the author Wendy Lesser.

References

American biographers
American women biographers
American women novelists
20th-century American non-fiction writers
21st-century American novelists
1925 births
Living people
21st-century American women writers
20th-century American women writers
PEN/Faulkner Award for Fiction winners
21st-century American non-fiction writers
Hunter College alumni
San Francisco State University alumni
Princeton University staff